Takhar is one of the thirty-four provinces of Afghanistan, located in the northeast of the country next to Tajikistan. It is surrounded by Badakhshan in the east, Panjshir in the south, and Baghlan and Kunduz in the west. The city of Taloqan serves as its capital.

The province contains 17 districts, over 1,000 villages, and approximately 1,113,173 people, which is multi-ethnic and mostly a rural society.

The city was attacked during the 2021 Taliban offensive (which coincided with the withdrawal of United States troops).

On May 2, 2021, PiramQul Ziayi, the most influential anti-Taliban figure in Takhar, was assassinated in Rustaq district.

Following the fall of several districts of Takhar to the Taliban, on June 20, 2021, a group of Takhar elders led by Mohibullah Noori, a Resistance leader, announced at a press conference in Kabul that will mobilize people resistance in support of security forces in Takhar. Mohibullah Noori led the group entered the Taloqan City on June 26, 2021 and united the Takhar commanders to resist against Taliban.

The Taliban tried to take the city in July 2021, however the attack was repulsed. Later during the huge Taliban offensive  Haji Agha Gul was killed by Taliban and Khair Mohammad Teymour injured and all forces, including provincial officials, retreated to the Versaj district. On August 8, 2021, the Taliban gained control of the province during the 2021 Taliban offensive. However, National Resistance Front fighters have still maintained a presence in the province.

History

Early history

7th to 16th centuries

16th to 20th centuries 

Between the early 16th century and the mid-18th century, the territory was ruled by the Khanate of Bukhara.

It was given to Ahmad Shah Durrani by Murad Beg of Bukhara after a treaty of friendship was reached in or about 1750, and became part of the Durrani Empire. It was ruled by the Durranis followed by the Barakzai dynasty and was untouched by the British during the three Anglo-Afghan wars that were fought in the 19th and early 20th centuries.

1964–2001 
It was established in 1964 when Qataghan Province was divided into three provinces: Baghlan, Kunduz and Takhar. During the 1980s Soviet–Afghan War, the area fell under the influence of Rabbani and Ahmad Shah Massoud. It was controlled by the Northern Alliance in the 1990s. It experienced some fighting between the Northern Alliance and the Taliban forces. Takhar holds notoriety as the location where Mujahideen Commander Ahmad Shah Massoud was assassinated on 9 September 2001 by suspected al-Qaeda agents.

2001–2015 

International Security Assistance Force (ISAF) took over security responsibility of the area in the early 2000s, which was led by Germany. The province also began to see some developments and the establishment of Afghan National Security Forces (ANSF). In a small incident in July 2008, the Afghan National Police killed Mullah Usman when several armed Taliban militants under his command raided a police checkpoint in the Kalafgan district. This was the first time since the fall of Taliban regime in 2001 that the Taliban insurgents engaged police in this province. Mullah Usman was the most senior Taliban commander in the northeast region of Afghanistan, according to the Afghan Interior Ministry.

In May 2009, Taliban insurgents fighting Afghan government attacked the Baharak district in Takhar province. A bomb attack on 28 May 2011 killed General Shahjahan Noori, Mohammed Daud Daud and injured Governor Taqwa. Several German soldiers and Afghans were also killed.

In April 2012, the water supply at the Rostaq district's school for girls was poisoned by unknown insurgents, sickening at least 140 Afghan schoolgirls and teachers ranging in age from 14 to 30, causing them to be hospitalized and some to partially lose consciousness, though there were no deaths as a result of the incident.

2015 earthquake 

On 26 October, the 7.5 Mw Hindu Kush earthquake shook northern Afghanistan with a maximum Mercalli intensity of VIII (Severe). This earthquake destroyed almost 30,000 homes, left several hundred dead, and more than 1,700 injured.

Demographics

As of 2021, the total population of the province is about 1,113,173 which is mostly tribal and a rural society. The main inhabitants of Takhar province are majority Tajiks and Uzbek Pashtuns.

District information

Economy

Agriculture and mining are the main industries of the province. Takhar has coal reserves which are being exploited by hand in some villages and sold in the region. The local population considers gold the most relevant resource for the Province. Gold is being washed in Takhar River, and about 2 kg are being transported to the specific weekly markets in the city of Taloqan. Also the city is a main source of construction materials like: loam, sand, and different types of stones. Takhar province is known for its salt mountains and you can find large deposits of fine salt in the region. The Takcha Khanna salt mine is one of the growing number of salt supplier, for the population of Takhar and northern Afghanistan. While the mines offer economic opportunities in the region, the availability of iodized salt considerably reduces the prevalence of health problems related to iodine deficiency.

See also
Tokharistan
Taloqan

Footnotes

External links 

Naval Postgraduate School - Takhar Province
Ministry of Rural Rehabilitation and Development - Takhar Province
Defense Video & Imagery Distribution System - Takhar Province
Takhar (pictures of Takhar province)

 
Provinces of Afghanistan
States and territories established in 1964
Provinces of the Islamic Republic of Afghanistan